Paterson F.C. (also sometimes known as the Dovers) was an American soccer club based in Paterson, New Jersey was a member of the professional American Soccer League.

The club was previously known as the Trenton Highlanders.

Year-by-year

Defunct soccer clubs in New Jersey
American Soccer League (1933–1983) teams
Sports in Paterson, New Jersey

nl:Paterson FC